Nimrod Lindsay Norton (April 18, 1830 – September 28, 1903) was a Confederate politician who served in the Confederate States Congress during the American Civil War.

Biography
Norton was born in Nicholas County, Kentucky, and later moved to Missouri. During the Civil War, he was a colonel in the Confederate Army. He represented the state in the Second Confederate Congress from 1864 to 1865.

References

1830 births
1903 deaths
Confederate States Army officers
Members of the Confederate House of Representatives from Missouri
19th-century American politicians
People from Nicholas County, Kentucky